Garinger High School (sometimes referred to simply as Garinger or The G) is a high school located in Charlotte, North Carolina.

History
Garinger was in essence the relocation of Central High School, making it one of the oldest remaining schools in Charlotte. The school's origins date back to 1908–09, when the class of 1909 received their diplomas in the first graduation of Charlotte High School. In 1920, Charlotte High School relocated to a larger building on East Morehead Street and was re-named Alexander Graham High School. In 1923, a new school building located on Elizabeth Avenue opened as Central High School. Central received all students who were attending Alexander Graham High.

In 1959, Central High moved to its current facility on Eastway Drive and was renamed Garinger High School in honor of Dr. Elmer H. Garinger, a former principal of Central High and superintendent of the Charlotte City Schools. The building was not condemned and Charlotte College, a night school, continued to operate from the old Central High building until it was absorbed by Central Piedmont Community College.

In early 2006 the school found itself threatened with closure by the State of North Carolina, but received backing from the City of Charlotte and Mecklenburg County.

Historical landmark
The Charlotte-Mecklenburg Historical Landmarks Commission is considering placing Garinger High School on their study list. If placed on the study list a motion would go before the city council who would vote on the issue.

New schools on campus
In the beginning of the 2006–2007 school year, two schools were inaugurated in the CMS system on the Garinger Campus. New Technology High School at Garinger, and International Studies at Garinger. The following year, three more schools were added: the School of Math and Science at Garinger, the School of Leadership and Public Services at Garinger, and the School of Business and Finance at Garinger.

New Technology School at Garinger
Math and Science School at Garinger
International Studies School at Garinger
Leadership and Public Service School at Garinger
Business and Finance School at Garinger

Charlotte Mecklenburg Schools announced that the five small schools on the Garinger campus would become a one school again under the name of "Garinger High School," effective in the 2011-2012 school year.

Campus
Garinger High School is located in East Charlotte at 1100 Eastway Dr. 

Garinger's campus was designed by AG Odell, Jr. and Associates. Near the center of campus sits a unique circular building with a conical roof, which served as the original library. It has since been converted into classroom space and much of the interior integrity has been lost. A new two-story library was added in the 1970s. 

The campus was considered state-of-the-art when it first opened, winning many architectural awards for its unique modern buildings. Garinger was featured in a 1962 edition of National Geographic as Charlotte-Mecklenburg's showplace high school.

Traditions

Garinger has many long standing traditions, many of which were carried over from Central High. The teams are known as the "Wildcats," and the school colors are blue and white; high school teams under that nickname and colors have played since 1908 at Charlotte High/Central High.

Fight song
Garinger's fight song is based on The Washington and Lee Swing.

Willow tree
The official symbol of Garinger High School is the weeping willow tree.  The school's annual literary magazine is called Under the Willow Tree.

Sports
Garinger's mascot is a wildcat, and the school colors are royal blue and gray.  These traditions harken back to the days of Charlotte Central High School. Garinger competes as a North Carolina High School Athletic Association (NCHSAA) 4A school.

While competitive and occasionally successful in basketball, track and field, and golf, the Wildcats have struggled greatly in other sports, most notably football (discussed below). Garinger often sells out its intimate 600-capacity gym for basketball games against West Charlotte and Independence.

One of Garinger's historic forms, Charlotte (later Central) High School, was a football powerhouse and used American Legion Memorial Stadium as its home field in its latter days.

Garinger's current stadium is Phil Hughston Memorial Stadium, named for a player who died from injuries sustained in a 1971 football game.

Honors
 NCHSAA State Championships:
 Baseball (1930*, 1932*, 1965)
 Men's basketball (1931*, 1932*, 1933*, 1934*, 1989)
 Football (1916*, 1917*, 1923*, 1929*, 1930*, 1932*, 1936*, 1937*, 1943*, 1959)
 Men's Outdoor Track & Field (1923*, 1924*, 1925*, 1926*, 1927*, 1929*, 1930*, 1931*, 1933*, 1937*, 1938*, 1941*, 1942*, 1944*, 1952*, 1990)

(*) As Charlotte or Central High

Football losing streaks
Garinger won a North Carolina football state championship the first year the school went under the name Garinger High in 1959. In the ensuing next couple decades, the team saw relative success, and produced NFL players such as multiple time Pro Bowl and Super Bowl champion Dwight Clark who made 'the catch' in the 1982 NFC Championship game, and Troy Pelshak who won Super Bowl XXXIV with the St. Louis Rams. From around the early 1990s and onward however, the team has struggled.

From 2002–2007 Garinger was stricken by North Carolina's longest active losing streak. In September 2007 the streak reached a staggering 51 games before news broke of violations by North Mecklenburg, Providence, and Vance High Schools. Garinger was retroactively awarded wins against North Meck and Vance ending the streak. The streak was also reduced to 49 games as a result of having played Vance in August. Garinger's final record for 2007 was declared to be 4–7, the school's best record in well over two decades.

On October 6, 2008, while celebrating the school's 100th anniversary and homecoming, Garinger had their first honorable win against West Mecklenburg High School, beating them 32–12. They went on to end the season with a couple more wins and even made it to the North Carolina High School Athletic Association 2008 playoffs, the first time in 18 years.

From 2011–2017 Garinger was stricken by another long losing streak. This time spanning 6 seasons and 55 games. On September 8, 2017, the streak finally came to a close when the team beat Monroe's Central Academy of Technology and Arts by a final score of 42–0.

Notable alumni
 Sunshine Anderson, R&B artist, soul singer, and songwriter
 Jim Beatty, first man to break the four-minute mile on an indoor track (Central High)
 John Belk, business man, benefactor, and former mayor of Charlotte (Central High)
 Mary Gardner Belk, member of the North Carolina General Assembly
 Camilo Benitez, professional soccer player
 Dwight Clark, former NFL wide receiver, two-time Pro Bowl selection and two-time Super Bowl champion with the San Francisco 49ers
 Michael Colina, musician, composer, and producer
 Mark Davidson, MLB outfielder from 1986 to 1991; member of 1987 Minnesota Twins World Series Champion team
 Walter E. Dellinger III, professor and solicitor (Central High)
 Sonny Dixon, MLB pitcher (Central High)
 John Donaldson, MLB second baseman
 Shalom Dutey, professional soccer player
 Chris Folk, served in the office of School Community Relations for Charlotte Mecklenburg Schools during desegregation and helped in implementing desegregation policies (Central High)
 K-Ci (Cedric Hailey), singer/songwriter
 Jack Helms, NFL player (Central High)
 Gary Hill, former MLB pitcher
 Patsy Kinsey, served as Mayor of Charlotte, North Carolina (Central High)
 Mary Norton Kratt, author (Central High)
 Charles Kuralt, award-winning American journalist, and CBS News Sunday Morning anchor (Central High)
 Doris Marie Leeper, sculptor and painter (Central High)
 Grady Little, former MLB manager
 Dan Locklair, music composer
 Robert Massey, former NFL player and current college football coach
 Tresor Mbuyu, professional soccer player
 Monk McDonald, former college athlete at University of North Carolina at Chapel Hill; member of North Carolina Sports Hall of Fame (Charlotte High)
 Sarah Parker, served as Chief Justice of the North Carolina Supreme Court
 Troy Pelshak, former NFL defensive end, Super Bowl XXXIV champion with the St. Louis Rams
 Robert Reid-Pharr, critical essayist and Distinguished Professor of English at the CUNY Graduate Center
 Jim Richards, former NFL defensive back, Super Bowl III champion with the New York Jets
 Wally Shoup, musician who specializes in being a jazz alto saxophonist
 Floyd Simmons, two-time Olympic bronze medalist in the decathlon (Central High)

See also
 Charlotte-Mecklenburg Schools

References

Notes
Garinger High School at Charlotte Mecklenburg Historic Landmarks Commission
About Garinger at Charlotte Mecklenburg Schools website

External links

 School's home page
Garinger - Central High School Alumni Association website

Public high schools in North Carolina
Educational institutions established in 1959
Schools in Charlotte, North Carolina
1959 establishments in North Carolina